Turbonilla martae is a species of sea snail, a marine gastropod mollusk in the family Pyramidellidae, the pyrams and their allies.

Description
The shell grows to a length of 10 mm.

Distribution
This species occurs in the Atlantic Ocean from the Western Sahara to Angola.

References

External links
 To World Register of Marine Species
 

martae
Gastropods described in 1997